Basinów  is a village in the administrative district of Gmina Zabrodzie, within Wyszków County, Masovian Voivodeship, in east-central Poland.

In the Polish census of 2021, the village has a population of 124.

References

Villages in Wyszków County